Studley Green is a hamlet located on the A40 between Piddington and Stokenchurch in Buckinghamshire, England. The term 'Studley Green' is also used to collectively refer to the four adjacent hamlets of Studley Green, Horsleys Green, Beacon's Bottom and Waterend.

References

Hamlets in Buckinghamshire